The 2001 Golden Globes (Portugal) were held at the Coliseu dos Recreios, Lisbon on 7 April 2001.

Winners
Cinema:
Best Film: Capitães de Abril, with Maria de Medeiros
Best Director: Manoel de Oliveira
Best Actress: Maria de Medeiros, in (Capitães de Abril)
Best Actor: Vítor Norte, in Tarde Demais

Sports:
Personality of the Year: Luís Figo

Fashion:
Personality of the Year: Portugal Fashion

Theatre:
Personality of the Year: Filipe La Féria

Music:
Best Performer: Camané
Best Group: Silence 4
Best Song: Sopro do Coração- Clã

Television:
Best Information Host: Rodrigo Guedes de Carvalho
Best Entertainment Host: Carlos Cruz
Best Fiction and Comedy Show: Cuidado com as Aparências
Best Entertainment Show: Herman SIC
Best Information Program: Esta Semana

Rádio:
Personality of the Year – Fernando Alves

Career Award:
João Lagos

References

2000 film awards
2000 music awards
2000 television awards
Golden Globes (Portugal)
2001 in Portugal